Arthur Lamont "Tiger" McFarland (July 7, 1874 – August 21, 1959) was an early professional American football player who played with the Greensburg Athletic Association as well as the Latrobe Athletic Association. He later played for the Philadelphia Athletics in the 1902 version of the National Football League and for the 1903 US Football Champions, the Franklin Athletic Club. Sweet also won, with Franklin, the 1903 World Series of Football, held that December at Madison Square Garden.

At the same time McFarland was enjoying his professional career, he also played at the college level. While McFarland played professional football for Greensburg and Latrobe, he still claimed his amateur status by playing for the Washington & Jefferson Presidents. After playing two seasons for the Presidents, McFarland played his two seasons for West Virginia Mountaineers.

For 1906 to 1908, McFarland was the head football coach at Ohio University, compiling a record of 13–10–1 record in three seasons. He died at hospital in Martins Ferry, Ohio in 1959.

Head coaching record

Football

References

Additional sources
 
 
 
 
 
 
 
 

1874 births
1959 deaths
19th-century players of American football
American football tackles
Franklin Athletic Club players
Greensburg Athletic Association players
Latrobe Athletic Association players
Ohio Bobcats baseball coaches
Ohio Bobcats football coaches
Philadelphia Athletics (NFL) players
Washington & Jefferson Presidents football players
West Virginia Mountaineers football players
Sportspeople from Springfield, Ohio
Coaches of American football from Ohio
Players of American football from Ohio